The Kay Yow National Coach of the Year Award is an award given annually to the women's college basketball head coach in NCAA Division I competition who displays great character both on and off the court. The award was established in 2010 and is named for legendary women's head coach Kay Yow, who coached at NC State from 1975 to 2009 before succumbing to stage 4 breast cancer. Yow was diagnosed with breast cancer in 1987 but still continued to coach until the illness forced her to take a medical leave of absence in early 2009. Yow accumulated over 700 wins as a head coach, and also led the United States women's basketball team to an Olympic gold medal in 1988.

Selection
The award is presented to the coach who has exhibited great personal character both as a coach and as a person. A committee of 26 members, ranging from women's basketball analysts, former and current head coaches, and Yow's three siblings (sisters Deborah and Susan, and brother Ronnie), chooses the winner among a field of finalists.

Winners

See also
 Clair Bee Coach of the Year Award – a character award given to an NCAA Division I men's basketball coach
 Skip Prosser Man of the Year Award – an annual award given to an NCAA Division I men's basketball coach who exhibits moral character off the court; the award is also presented by CollegeInsider.com

References
General

Specific

External links
Official site

Awards established in 2010
College basketball coaching awards in the United States